Mucinous carcinoma of the breast is a form of mucinous carcinoma and a breast cancer type. Rare cases of this carcinoma have been diagnosed in men (see male breast cancer).

References

Breast cancer
Carcinoma